Micrommata aragonensis is a spider species found in Spain.

See also 
 List of Sparassidae species

References

External links 

Sparassidae
Fauna of Spain
Spiders of Europe
Spiders described in 2004